This is a list of Norwegian football transfers in the 2019–20 winter transfer window by club. Only clubs of the 2020 Eliteserien and 2020 1. divisjon are included.

The Norwegian winter transfer window ended on 31 March 2020. It is possible to loan players aged 18 to 22 outside of the transfer windows. The player must be homegrown in the club which loans the player out.

Eliteserien

Aalesund

In:

 
 
 

 

Out:

Bodø/Glimt

In:

Out:

Brann

In:

 

 

Out:

Haugesund

In:

Out:

Kristiansund

In:

 

 
 

Out:

Mjøndalen

In:

 

 

 

 

Out:

Molde

In:

Out:

Odd

In:

Out:

Rosenborg

In:

Out:

Sandefjord

In:

Out:

Sarpsborg 08

In:

 
 

 

Out:

Stabæk

In:

  

Out:

Start

In:

Out:

Strømsgodset

In:

Out:

Viking

In:

Out:

Vålerenga

In:

Out:

1. divisjon

Grorud

In:

Out:

HamKam

In:

Out:

Jerv

In:

Out:

KFUM Oslo

In:

Out:

Kongsvinger

In:

Out:

Lillestrøm

In:

Out:

Ranheim

In:

Out:

Raufoss

In:

Out:

Sandnes Ulf

In:

Out:

Sogndal

In:

Out:

Stjørdals-Blink

In:

Out:

Strømmen

In:

  
 
  

Out:

Tromsø

In:

Out:

Ull/Kisa

In:

Out:

Øygarden (formerly Nest-Sotra)

In:

Out:

Åsane

In:

Out:

References

Norway
Transfers
Transfers
2019-20